Mimozotale flavolineata is a species of beetle in the family Cerambycidae. It was described by Breuning in 1951. It is known from Sumatra.

References

Desmiphorini
Beetles described in 1951